Broughton is a historic village, modern district and civil parish in Milton Keynes, Buckinghamshire, England. , it is governed by Broughton and Milton Keynes Joint Parish Council, which it shares with the neighboring Milton Keynes parish. Today, Broughton is a large district of (greater) Milton Keynes that has been developed around the original village and that grew substantially during the 2000s and 2010s.

History and location

The name is Old English and meant 'brook farm'. In the Domesday Book, it is listed as owned by a Walter Giffard and the tenant was a Hugh de Bolbec. In the 6th century, its name was spelt Brotone.  The original Northampton to London turnpike came through the village (to join Watling Street [now the A5 road] near Woburn).

The section of the old LondonNorthampton turnpike, once the A50, later part of the A5130 (comprising Newport Road and Fen Street), is now declassified. It connects to Kingston, Magna Park and the A421/Standing Way (H8) to the south, and a roundabout with Child's Way (H6) and A509/Portway (H5) to the north. The original route through centre of the old village, named London Road, was bypassed in the early 1970s, and the newer route runs between it and another MK district, Brook Furlong, and provides what would be the eastern boundary if the district hadn't expanded. Finally, Chaffron Way (H7), provides the southern boundary: in mid-2009 this was extended to meet the (former) A5130 and was opened to traffic in March 2010.

The district can be split into at least three areas. The original Broughton village forms part of a conservation area at the northern end, bounded by the brook and Newport Road. Atterbury is an area of new build housing, predominantly between the western side of the brook and Tongwell Street (V11). Broughton Gate and Brooklands are two new areas, part of the "Milton Keynes Eastern Expansion area" and cover the area to the east of the brook; the former covers the area to the west of Newport Rd, and the latter covers the area to the east of the road. A small cable-stayed bridge is one of two main road crossings across Broughton Brook, the third and newest is the extension of H7 Chaffron Way (as 'Countess Way')  between Brooklands and Kingston.

Education
Broughton Fields primary school and Brooklands Farm primary school serve the area, whilst secondary education is provided by Oakgrove School in nearby Middleton and the Walton High School campus in Brooklands. In addition, Broughton Manor Preparatory school, a private prep school, is also situated near to the old village.

Facilities

The facilities in the area include a "Hungry Horse" chain public house, and a range of small shops, hair dressers and convenience stores.

Broughton is within easy walking distance of the Milton Keynes Coachway. The Kingston Shopping Centre  which includes one of the UK's larger Tesco stores, a variety of retail outlets, a branch library and a community centre  is in the adjacent grid-square.

A site for a community playing fields has been also been identified between the old village and the primary school.
Broughton Pavilion is located on the edge of this field and hosts a variety of groups.

The Broughton Brook linear park stretches the length of the brook as it travels through the area. This provides recreation space for residents. At the northern tip of Broughton, there is considerable open space and a conservation area. Although the population of this area has grown considerably, this open space is underused and provides a quiet retreat.

Civil parish
, Broughton CP operates as a joint parish council with Milton Keynes (village) CP, known as Broughton and Milton Keynes Parish Council. This part of the combined parish includes Broughton itself, Broughton Manor and Brooklands. The latter two are modern development districts that are part of the 'Eastern Expansion Area'. Consequently they have "city streets" rather than grid roads: Countess Way is a continuation of Chaffron Way (H7) but is both a local service road and a city distributor road. The same is true of Fen Street.

Brooklands
Brooklands is primarily a housing area: a building of note is the Brooklands Campus of Walton High School, whose main campus is in Walnut Tree.

Pineham
Pineham is a small district enclosed by the M1, Portway (H5/A509) and Tongwell Street (V11). Most of its area is taken up by Anglian Water's sewage treatment plant and a BMX track.

The name "Pineham" was used for an electoral ward for Milton Keynes Council elections from 1976 (to 2002). It consisted of the parishes of Woolstone-cum-Willen, Moulsoe, Broughton, Milton Keynes and Walton.

St Lawrence's Church

St Lawrence's Church in Broughton is 14th-century church with a 15th-century tower. A series of wall paintings covering large parts of the north and south walls, discovered during an 1849 restoration, are the chief interest of the church. The paintings include a 14th-century Pietà, a Doom, St Helena and St Eligius, and St George slaying the Dragon.

The Rectors of St Lawrence are recorded from the end of 1261 to date, many may be interned within the grounds of St Lawrence.

Canal development

Its promoters hope that a proposed new waterway between Milton Keynes and Bedford will run along the line of Broughton Brook.

References

External links
 The website of the joint Broughton and Milton Keynes civil parish council.
  VisitChurches.org entry for St Lawrences.

Villages in Buckinghamshire
Areas of Milton Keynes
Civil parishes in Buckinghamshire